Isabelle Olsson may refer to:
 Isabelle Olsson (figure skater) (born 1993), Swedish figure skater
 Isabelle Olsson (designer), industrial designer responsible for the appearance of Google Glass